The Griffith Building, also known as the Griffith Piano Company Building, is located at 605-607 Broad Street by Military Park in the city of Newark in Essex County, New Jersey. It was built in 1927 and was added to the National Register of Historic Places on May 24, 1984, for its significance in architecture, commerce, and music. It was added as a contributing property to the Military Park Commons Historic District on June 18, 2004.

History and description

The Griffith Piano Company was founded in 1911 by Parker O. Griffith. The building was designed by local architect George Elwood Jones (1886–1952), construction started in 1927, and opened on June 1, 1928. The company erected the building as a showroom, workshop, office tower and recital auditorium. Under the direction of Mrs. Parker O. Griffith, a foundation supported by the company was responsible for the direction, support, and programming at Newark Symphony Hall.

Plans to renovate the building into apartments have been proposed but have yet to bear fruit.

See also
National Register of Historic Places listings in Essex County, New Jersey
List of tallest buildings in Newark

References

External links 
 

Buildings and structures in Newark, New Jersey
National Register of Historic Places in Newark, New Jersey
Commercial buildings on the National Register of Historic Places in New Jersey
Skyscraper office buildings in Newark, New Jersey
Gothic Revival architecture in New Jersey
1927 establishments in New Jersey
Commercial buildings completed in 1927
Industrial buildings completed in 1927
Office buildings completed in 1927
New Jersey Register of Historic Places
Historic district contributing properties in New Jersey
Historic district contributing properties in Newark, New Jersey
Individually listed contributing properties to historic districts on the National Register in New Jersey